(–)-α-Cuprenene synthase (EC 4.2.3.95, Cop6) is an enzyme with systematic name (–)-α -cuprenene hydrolase (cyclizing, (–)-α-cuprenene-forming). This enzyme catalyses the following chemical reaction

 (2E,6E)-farnesyl diphosphate  (–)-α-cuprenene + diphosphate

The enzyme from the fungus Coprinopsis cinerea produces (–)-α-cuprenene with high selectivity.

References

External links 
 

EC 4.2.3